Kadadahalli is a village in Dharwad district of Karnataka, India.

Demographics 
As of the 2011 Census of India there were 153 households in Kadadahalli and a total population of 825 consisting of 415 males and 410 females. There were 139 children ages 0-6.

References

Villages in Dharwad district